Gurley is a surname. Notable people with the surname include:

Akai Gurley (c. 1986–2014), African American shot and killed by mistake by a New York City policeman 
Bill Gurley (born 1966), American venture capitalist
Buck Gurley (born 1978), former American college and professional football player
Fred Gurley (1889–1976), president and executive committee chairman of Atchison, Topeka and Santa Fe Railway
Henry Hosford Gurley (1788–1833), member of U.S. House of Representatives for Louisiana
James Gurley (1939–2009), American musician
John A. Gurley (1813–1863), Civil War–era Ohio congressman
Michael Gurley, American musician
O.W. Gurley, (1867-1935), businessman and real-estate developer known for being a founder of Greenwood District
Phineas Densmore Gurley (1816–1868), Chaplain of the U.S. Senate and Presbyterian pastor in Washington, D.C.
Ralph Randolph Gurley (1797–1872), clergyman and a major force in the American Colonization Society
Roger Gurley (born 1965), football coach and referee from Saint Vincent and the Grenadines
Todd Gurley (born 1994), American football player
Tony Gurley (born 1956), American businessman and political figure from North Carolina
Tori Gurley (born 1987), American football player
William Gurley (1821–1887) co-founded what is now known as Gurley Precision Instruments in Troy, New York State
Zenas H. Gurley, Sr. (1801–1871), leader in the Latter Day Saint movement

See also
Rebecca Gurley Bace (1955-2017), computer security expert and pioneer in intrusion detection
Helen Gurley Brown (1922–2012), author and longtime editor-in-chief of Cosmopolitan magazine
Elizabeth Gurley Flynn (1890–1964), feminist socialist organizer